Rhagovelia plumbea is a species of smaller water strider in the family Veliidae. It is found in the Caribbean, Central America, North America, and South America.

References

Veliidae
Articles created by Qbugbot
Insects described in 1894